Cain International (formerly Cain Hoy Enterprises) is a privately held real estate investment firm headquartered in London. As of 2022, the company had over $14 billion in assets under management.

History

Early history and founding 
Cain International was co-founded by Jonathan Goldstein and Todd Boehly in 2014, with minority backing from Guggenheim Partners. The company's early investments were a number of mixed-use developments in the United Kingdom before expanding to hotels, restaurant, housing and entertainment developments.

The firm was in talks to buy Tottenham Hotspur F.C. in 2014, but later pulled out of negotiations. Cain's CEO Goldstein later became a co-owner and director of Chelsea F.C., in 2022.

Cain Hoy entered a joint venture with Galliard Homes in 2015 to develop high rise apartments in Canary Wharf.

In 2014, Cain Hoy Enterprises loaned $167 million to SBE Entertainment Group as part of the company's recapitalization. As part of the deal, three principals from Cain Hoy joined SBE's board of directors. They later stepped down from the board in December 2014. In 2016, Cain Hoy acquired a 25% stake in SBE Entertainment as part of a joint venture to acquire Morgans Hotel Group. It exited this investment in 2018 when it sold this stake to AccorHotels.

International expansion and rebranding 
By 2016, the firm had invested over $1.4 billion in real estate development, and had begun to expand into the United States and Europe. Cain Hoy was renamed Cain International in 2017. In 2019, the company opened an office in Los Angeles.

In 2018, the company purchased a $345 million stake in The Beverly Hilton and Waldorf-Astoria Beverly Hills as part of a joint venture with Israeli hotelier Beny Alagem. In 2021, the partnership received approval from the city council to begin construction on One Beverly Hills, a mixed-use development spanning 17.5 acres that includes the Beverly Hilton, the Waldorf Astoria, and a planned Aman Hotel, Residences & Club.

Since 2018, Cain International has developed a number of skyscrapers in Miami, including the Una Residences, Missonia Baia and 830 Brickell Tower.

In April 2021, Cain International and OKO Group, a Miami-based real estate development firm, received a loan from Bank OZK to a construct the Missoni Baia tower in South Brickell, Miami. The Missoni Baia tower was topped off in June 2021. Cain International and OKO Group also entered a joint venture to build One River, a highrise apartment in Fort Lauderdale.

In December 2020, the company acquired restaurant chain Prezzo. It also invested in the Raffles Boston Back Bay Hotel & Residences, which was topped-out in March 2022. As November 2022, the company had invested £46 million into mini golf chain Swingers.

Cain International raised €324 million for its first European real estate fund, with backing from Goldman Sachs and Security Benefit Life Insurance Company. The fund closed in May 2021. Cain International acquired a commercial site in Dublin, alongside Kennedy Wilson, in December 2018. Development of the site began in 2019 and is due for completion in two phases by 2023 and 2024.

The company provided a $117 million loan to Lendlease in November 2021 to finance the construction of The Reed, a development project in the Chicago Loop.

In 2022, the company partnered with Fusion Students to develop a student housing portfolio across London, Portsmouth, Liverpool, Manchester, Nottingham, and Birmingham. The company purchased Firethorn Trust's UK logistics portfolio for £550 million in March 2022. In April 2022, Blackstone Inc provided Cain International with £420 million in financing to develop the portfolio acquired in 2021.

In May 2022, the company agreed to loan £261.5 million to Shinfield Studios for the construction of a 1 million sq. ft. production facility. Once completed, the facility will be one of the largest film and television production studios in the United Kingdom.

In 2022, the company and the Public Investment Fund of Saudi Arabia invested $900 million into Aman Group, to support the hospitality group's international expansion. The investment brought the group's valuation to $3 billion.

References 

Real estate companies of the United States
Companies based in London
Property companies of the United Kingdom
Real estate companies established in 2014